Gugong is the Chinese name for the Forbidden City in Beijing.

"Former palace"
Gugong literally means "former palace", and can also refer to:

 Mukden Palace in Shenyang, also known as "the Shenyang Gugong"
 National Palace Museum in Taipei, also known as "the Taipei Gugong"
 Hong Kong Palace Museum in Hong Kong, also known as "the Hong Kong Gugong"
 Ming Palace, Nanjing, also known as "the Ming Gugong" or "the Nanjing Gugong"
 Gugong (film), a 2005 large scale documentary series about the Forbidden City produced by China Central Television, directed by famous Chinese director Zhou Bing.

As name
 Gugong Danfu, Zhou Dynasty ancestor

See also
 Forbidden City (disambiguation)